Erik Peterson may refer to:
 Erik Peterson (politician) (Erik C. Peterson), member of the New Jersey General Assembly
 Erik C. Peterson (general), United States Army general
 Erik Peterson (theologian), German theologian and Christian archeologist

See also
 Erik Petersen (disambiguation)
 Eric Peterson, Canadian actor
 Eric Peterson (musician), American guitarist